Kai Langerfeld (born July 5, 1987) is a Canadian rower. He won two gold medals at the 2015 Pan American Games.

In 2016 Kai competed on Canada's 2016 Olympic team in the Coxless Four which placed 6th overall.

He represented Canada at the 2020 Summer Olympics.

His father, York Langerfeld, competed at the 1976 Summer Olympics.

References

External links
 
 
 

1987 births
Living people
Rowers at the 2015 Pan American Games
Rowers at the 2011 Pan American Games
Pan American Games gold medalists for Canada
Pan American Games silver medalists for Canada
Canadian male rowers
Sportspeople from North Vancouver
Rowers at the 2016 Summer Olympics
Olympic rowers of Canada
Pan American Games medalists in rowing
World Rowing Championships medalists for Canada
Medalists at the 2015 Pan American Games
Rowers at the 2020 Summer Olympics
21st-century Canadian people